Major Sir Ernest Henry Shackleton  (15 February 1874 – 5 January 1922) was an Anglo-Irish Antarctic explorer who led three British expeditions to the Antarctic. He was one of the principal figures of the period known as the Heroic Age of Antarctic Exploration.

Born in Kilkea, County Kildare, Ireland, Shackleton and his Anglo-Irish family moved to Sydenham in suburban south London when he was ten. Shackleton's first experience of the polar regions was as third officer on Captain Robert Falcon Scott's Discovery expedition of 1901–1904, from which he was sent home early on health grounds, after he and his companions Scott and Edward Adrian Wilson set a new southern record by marching to latitude 82°S. During the Nimrod expedition of 1907–1909, he and three companions established a new record Farthest South latitude at 88°S, only 97 geographical miles (112 statute miles or 180 kilometres) from the South Pole, the largest advance to the pole in exploration history. Also, members of his team climbed Mount Erebus, the most active Antarctic volcano. For these achievements, Shackleton was knighted by King Edward VII on his return home.

After the race to the South Pole ended in December 1911, with Roald Amundsen's conquest, Shackleton turned his attention to the crossing of Antarctica from sea to sea, via the pole. To this end, he made preparations for what became the Imperial Trans-Antarctic Expedition, 1914–1917. Disaster struck this expedition when its ship, became trapped in pack ice and was slowly crushed before the shore parties could be landed. In 1921, he returned to the Antarctic with the Shackleton–Rowett Expedition, but died of a heart attack while his ship was moored in South Georgia. At his wife's request, he was buried there. The wreck of Endurance was discovered just over a century later. 

Away from his expeditions, Shackleton's life was generally restless and unfulfilled. In his search for rapid pathways to wealth and security, he launched business ventures which failed to prosper, and he died heavily in debt. Upon his death, he was lauded in the press but was thereafter largely forgotten, while the heroic reputation of his rival Scott was sustained for many decades. Later in the 20th century, Shackleton was "rediscovered", and became a role model for leadership in extreme circumstances.

In his 1956 address to the British Science Association, Sir Raymond Priestley, one of his contemporaries, said "Scott for scientific method, Amundsen for speed and efficiency but when disaster strikes and all hope is gone, get down on your knees and pray for Shackleton", paraphrasing what Apsley Cherry-Garrard had written in a preface to his 1922 memoir The Worst Journey in the World. In 2002, Shackleton was voted eleventh in a BBC poll of the 100 Greatest Britons.

Early years

Childhood 

Shackleton was born on 15 February 1874, in Kilkea, County Kildare, Ireland. His father, Henry Shackleton, tried to enter the British Army, but his poor health prevented him from doing so. He became a farmer instead, settling in Kilkea. The Shackleton family are of English origin, specifically from Yorkshire. Abraham Shackleton, an English Quaker, moved to Ireland in 1726 and started a school at Ballitore, County Kildare. Shackleton's mother, Henrietta Letitia Sophia Gavan, was descended from the Fitzmaurice family. Ernest was the second of their ten children and the first of two sons; the second, Frank, achieved notoriety as a suspect, later exonerated, in the 1907 theft of the so-called Irish Crown Jewels, which have never been recovered.

In 1880, when Ernest was six, Henry Shackleton gave up his life as a landowner to study medicine at Trinity College, Dublin (TCD), moving his family to the city. Four years later, the family moved again, from Ireland to Sydenham in suburban London. Partly this was in search of better professional prospects for the newly qualified doctor, but another factor may have been unease about their Anglo-Irish ancestry, following the assassination by Irish nationalists of Lord Frederick Cavendish, the British Chief Secretary for Ireland, in 1882. However, Shackleton took lifelong pride in his Irish roots, and frequently declared, "I am an Irishman".

Education 
From early childhood, Shackleton was a voracious reader, a pursuit which sparked a passion for adventure. He was schooled by a governess until the age of eleven, when he began at Fir Lodge Preparatory School in West Hill, Dulwich, in southeast London. At the age of thirteen, he entered Dulwich College. The young Shackleton did not particularly distinguish himself as a scholar, and was said to be "bored" by his studies.

He was quoted later as saying: "I never learned much geography at school ... Literature, too, consisted in the dissection, the parsing, the analysing of certain passages from our great poets and prose-writers ... teachers should be very careful not to spoil [their pupils'] taste for poetry for all time by making it a task and an imposition." In his final term at the school he was still able to achieve fifth place in his class of thirty-one.

Merchant Navy officer 

Shackleton's restlessness at school was such that he was allowed to leave at 16 and go to sea. The third option was chosen. His father was able to secure him a berth with the North Western Shipping Company, aboard the square-rigged sailing ship Hoghton Tower.

During the following four years at sea, Shackleton learned his trade, visiting the far corners of the earth and forming acquaintances with a variety of people from many walks of life, learning to be at home with many kinds of people. In August 1894, he passed his examination for second mate and accepted a post as third officer on a tramp steamer of the Welsh Shire Line. Two years later, he had obtained his first mate's ticket, and in 1898, he was certified as a master mariner, qualifying him to command a British ship anywhere in the world.

In 1898, Shackleton joined Union-Castle Line, the regular mail and passenger carrier between Southampton and Cape Town. He was, as a shipmate recorded, "a departure from our usual type of young officer", content with his own company though not aloof, "spouting lines from Keats [and] Browning", a mixture of sensitivity and aggression but, withal, sympathetic. Following the outbreak of the Boer War in 1899, Shackleton transferred to the troopship Tintagel Castle where, in March 1900, he met an army lieutenant, Cedric Longstaff, whose father Llewellyn W. Longstaff was the main financial backer of the National Antarctic Expedition then being organised in London.

Shackleton used his acquaintance with the son to obtain an interview with Longstaff senior, with a view to obtaining a place on the expedition. Longstaff, impressed by Shackleton's keenness, recommended him to Sir Clements Markham, the expedition's overlord, making it clear that he wanted Shackleton accepted. On 17 February 1901, his appointment as third officer to the expedition's ship Discovery was confirmed; on 4 June he was commissioned into the Royal Navy, with the rank of sub-lieutenant in the Royal Naval Reserve. Although officially on leave from Union-Castle, this was in fact the end of Shackleton's Merchant Navy service.

Discovery expedition, 1901–1903 

The British National Antarctic Expedition, known as the Discovery expedition after the ship , was the brainchild of Sir Clements Markham, president of the Royal Geographical Society, and had been many years in preparation. It was led by Robert Falcon Scott, a Royal Navy torpedo lieutenant lately promoted commander, and had objectives that included scientific and geographical discovery.

Although Discovery was not a Royal Navy unit, Scott required the crew, officers and scientific staff to submit to the conditions of the Naval Discipline Act, and the ship and expedition were run on Royal Navy lines. Shackleton accepted this, even though his own background and instincts favoured a different, more informal style of leadership. Shackleton's particular duties were listed as: "In charge of seawater analysis. Ward-room caterer. In charge of holds, stores and provisions [...] He also arranges the entertainments."

Discovery departed London on 31 July 1901, arriving at the Antarctic coast, via Cape Town and New Zealand, on 8 January 1902. After landing, Shackleton took part in an experimental balloon flight on 4 February. He also participated, with the scientists Edward Adrian Wilson and Hartley T. Ferrar, in the first sledging trip from the expedition's winter quarters in McMurdo Sound, a journey which established a safe route on to the Great Ice Barrier. During the Antarctic winter of 1902, in the confines of the iced-in Discovery, Shackleton edited the expedition's magazine the South Polar Times.

According to steward Clarence Hare, he was "the most popular of the officers among the crew, being a good mixer", though claims that this represented an unofficial rival leadership to Scott's are unsupported. Scott chose Shackleton to accompany Wilson and himself on the expedition's southern journey, a march southwards to achieve the highest possible latitude in the direction of the South Pole. This march was not a serious attempt on the Pole, although the attainment of a high latitude was of great importance to Scott, and the inclusion of Shackleton indicated a high degree of personal trust.

The party set out on 2 November 1902. The march was, Scott wrote later, "a combination of success and failure". A record Farthest South latitude of 82° 17' was reached, beating the previous record established in 1900 by Carsten Borchgrevink. The journey was marred by the poor performance of the dogs, whose food had become tainted, and who rapidly fell sick. All 22 dogs died during the march. The three men all suffered at times from snow blindness, frostbite and, ultimately, scurvy. On the return journey, Shackleton had by his own admission "broken down" and could no longer carry out his share of the work.

He later denied Scott's claim in The Voyage of the Discovery, that he had been carried on the sledge. He was in a seriously weakened condition; Wilson's diary entry for 14 January reads: "Shackleton has been anything but up to the mark, and today he is decidedly worse, very short winded and coughing constantly, with more serious symptoms that need not be detailed here but which are of no small consequence one hundred and sixty miles from the ship".

On 4 February 1903, the party finally reached the ship. After a medical examination (which proved inconclusive), Scott decided to send Shackleton home on the relief ship , which had arrived in McMurdo Sound in January 1903. Scott wrote: "He ought not to risk further hardship in his present state of health." There is conjecture that Scott's motive for removing him was resentment of Shackleton's popularity, and that ill-health was used as an excuse to get rid of him.

Years after the death of Scott, Wilson and Shackleton, Albert Armitage, the expedition's second-in-command, claimed that there had been a falling-out on the southern journey, and that Scott had told the ship's doctor that "if he does not go back sick he will go back in disgrace." There is no corroboration of Armitage's story. Shackleton and Scott stayed on friendly terms, at least until the publication of Scott's account of the southern journey in The Voyage of the Discovery. Although in public they remained mutually respectful and cordial, according to biographer Roland Huntford, Shackleton's attitude to Scott turned to "smouldering scorn and dislike"; salvage of wounded pride required "a return to the Antarctic and an attempt to outdo Scott".

Shore work, 1903–1907 

After a period of convalescence in New Zealand, Shackleton returned to England via San Francisco and New York. As the first significant person to return from the Antarctic, he found that he was in demand; in particular, the Admiralty wished to consult him about its further proposals for the rescue of Discovery. With Sir Clements Markham's blessing, he accepted a temporary post assisting the outfitting of the Terra Nova for the second Discovery relief operation, but turned down the offer to sail with her as chief officer. He also assisted in the equipping of the Argentine , which was being fitted out for the relief of the stranded Swedish Antarctic Expedition under Otto Nordenskjöld.

In search of more permanent employment, Shackleton applied for a regular commission in the Royal Navy, via the back-door route of the Supplementary List, but despite the sponsorship of Markham and William Huggins, the president of the Royal Society, he was not successful. Instead, he became a journalist, working for the Royal Magazine, but he found this unsatisfactory. He was then offered, and accepted, the secretaryship of the Royal Scottish Geographical Society (RSGS), a post which he took up on 11 January 1904. On 9 April 1904, he married Emily Dorman, with whom he had three children: Raymond, Cecily, and Edward, himself an explorer and later a politician.

In 1905, Shackleton became a shareholder in a speculative company that aimed to make a fortune transporting Russian troops home from the Far East. Despite his assurances to Emily that "we are practically sure of the contract", nothing came of this scheme. He also ventured into politics, unsuccessfully standing in the 1906 General Election as the Liberal Unionist Party's candidate for Dundee constituency in opposition to Irish Home Rule. In the meantime he had taken a job with wealthy Clydeside industrialist William Beardmore (later Lord Invernairn), with a roving commission which involved interviewing prospective clients and entertaining Beardmore's business friends. Shackleton by this time was making no secret of his ambition to return to Antarctica at the head of his own expedition.

Beardmore was sufficiently impressed with Shackleton to offer financial support, but other donations proved hard to come by. Nevertheless, in February 1907, Shackleton presented to the Royal Geographical Society his plans for an Antarctic expedition, the details of which, under the name British Antarctic Expedition, were published in the Royal Geographical Society's newsletter, Geographical Journal. The aim was the conquest of both the geographical South Pole and the South Magnetic Pole. Shackleton then worked hard to persuade others of his wealthy friends and acquaintances to contribute, including Sir Philip Lee Brocklehurst, who subscribed £2,000 (approximately ) to secure a place on the expedition; author Campbell Mackellar; and Guinness baron Lord Iveagh, whose contribution was secured less than two weeks before the departure of the expedition ship Nimrod.

On 4 August 1907, Shackleton was appointed a Member of the Royal Victorian Order, 4th Class (MVO; the present-day grade of lieutenant).

Nimrod expedition, 1907–1909 

On 1 January 1908, the  set off on the British Antarctic Expedition from Lyttelton Harbour, New Zealand. Shackleton's original plans had envisaged using the old Discovery base in McMurdo Sound to launch his attempts on the South Pole and South Magnetic Pole. Before leaving England, he had been pressured to give an undertaking to Scott that he would not base himself in the McMurdo area, which Scott was claiming as his own field of work. Shackleton reluctantly agreed to look for winter quarters at either the Barrier Inlet—which Discovery had briefly visited in 1902—or King Edward VII Land.

To conserve coal, the ship was towed  by the steamer Koonya to the Antarctic ice, after Shackleton had persuaded the New Zealand government and the Union Steamship Company to share the cost. In accordance with Shackleton's promise to Scott, the ship headed for the eastern sector of the Great Ice Barrier, arriving there on 21 January 1908. They found that the Barrier Inlet had expanded to form a large bay, in which were hundreds of whales, which led to the immediate christening of the area as the Bay of Whales.

It was noted that ice conditions were unstable, precluding the establishment of a safe base there. An extended search for an anchorage at King Edward VII Land proved equally fruitless, so Shackleton was forced to break his undertaking to Scott and set sail for McMurdo Sound, a decision which, according to second officer Arthur Harbord, was "dictated by common sense" in view of the difficulties of ice pressure, coal shortage and the lack of any nearer known base. The party was in high spirits, despite the difficult conditions; Shackleton's ability to communicate with each man kept the party happy and focused.

The "Great Southern Journey", as Frank Wild called it, began on 29 October 1908. On 9 January 1909, Shackleton and three companions—Wild, Eric Marshall and Jameson Adams—reached a new Farthest South latitude of 88° 23' S, a point only  from the Pole. En route the South Pole party discovered the Beardmore Glacier—named after Shackleton's patron—and became the first persons to see and travel on the South Polar Plateau. Their return journey to McMurdo Sound was a race against starvation, on half-rations for much of the way. At one point, Shackleton gave his one biscuit allotted for the day to the ailing Frank Wild, who wrote in his diary: "All the money that was ever minted would not have bought that biscuit and the remembrance of that sacrifice will never leave me". They arrived at Hut Point just in time to catch the ship.

The expedition's other main accomplishments included the first ascent of Mount Erebus, and the discovery of the approximate location of the South Magnetic Pole, reached on 16 January 1909, by Edgeworth David, Douglas Mawson and Alistair Mackay. Shackleton returned to the United Kingdom as a hero, and soon afterwards published his expedition account, Heart of the Antarctic. Emily Shackleton later recorded: "The only comment he made to me about not reaching the Pole was 'a live donkey is better than a dead lion, isn't it?' and I said 'Yes darling, as far as I am concerned'".

In 1910, Shackleton made a series of three recordings describing the expedition using an Edison phonograph. Several mostly intact cases of whisky and brandy left behind in 1909 were recovered in 2010, for analysis by a distilling company. A revival of the vintage—and since lost—formula for the particular brands found has been offered for sale with a portion of the proceeds to benefit the New Zealand Antarctic Heritage Trust which discovered the lost spirits.

Between expeditions, 1909–1914

Public hero 

On Shackleton's return home, public honours were quickly forthcoming. King Edward VII received him on 10 July and raised him to a Commander of the Royal Victorian Order; in the King's Birthday Honours list in November, he was made a knight, becoming Sir Ernest Shackleton. He was honoured by the Royal Geographical Society, who awarded him a gold medal; a proposal that the medal be smaller than that earlier awarded to Captain Scott was not acted on. All the members of the Nimrod Expedition shore party received silver Polar Medals on 23 November, with Shackleton receiving a clasp to his earlier medal. Shackleton was also appointed a Younger Brother of Trinity House, a significant honour for British mariners.

Besides the official honours, Shackleton's Antarctic feats were greeted in Britain with great enthusiasm. Proposing a toast to the explorer at a lunch given in Shackleton's honour by the Royal Societies Club, Lord Halsbury, a former Lord Chancellor, said: "When one remembers what he had gone through, one does not believe in the supposed degeneration of the British race. One does not believe that we have lost all sense of admiration for courage [and] endurance". The heroism was also claimed by Ireland: the Dublin Evening Telegraph's headline read "South Pole Almost Reached by an Irishman", while the Dublin Express spoke of the "qualities that were his heritage as an Irishman".

Shackleton's fellow-explorers expressed their admiration; Roald Amundsen wrote, in a letter to RGS Secretary John Scott Keltie, that "the English nation has by this deed of Shackleton's won a victory that can never be surpassed". Fridtjof Nansen sent an effusive private letter to Emily Shackleton, praising the "unique expedition which has been such a complete success in every respect". The reality was that the expedition had left Shackleton deeply in debt, unable to meet the financial guarantees he had given to backers. Despite his efforts, it required government action, in the form of a grant of £20,000 (2008: £1.5 million) to clear the most pressing obligations. It is likely that many debts were not pressed and were written off.

Biding time 

In the period immediately after his return, Shackleton engaged in a strenuous schedule of public appearances, lectures and social engagements. He then sought to cash in on his celebrity by making a fortune in the business world. Among the ventures which he hoped to promote were a tobacco company, a scheme for selling to collectors postage stamps overprinted "King Edward VII Land" – based on Shackleton's appointment as Antarctic postmaster by the New Zealand authorities – and the development of a Hungarian mining concession he had acquired near the city of Nagybanya, now part of Romania.

None of these enterprises prospered, and his main source of income was his earnings from lecture tours. He still harboured thoughts of returning south, even though in September 1910, having recently moved with his family to Sheringham in Norfolk, he wrote to Emily: "I am never again going South and I have thought it all out and my place is at home now". He had been in discussions with Douglas Mawson about a scientific expedition to the Antarctic coast between Cape Adare and Gaussberg, and had written to the RGS about this in February 1910.

Any future resumption by Shackleton of the quest for the South Pole depended on the results of Scott's Terra Nova Expedition, which left from Cardiff in July 1910. By early 1912, the world was aware that the pole had been conquered, by the Norwegian Roald Amundsen. The fate of Scott's expedition was not then known. Shackleton's mind turned to a project that had been announced, and then abandoned, by the British explorer William Speirs Bruce, for a continental crossing, from a landing in the Weddell Sea, via the South Pole to McMurdo Sound. Bruce, who had failed to acquire financial backing, was happy that Shackleton should adopt his plans, which were similar to those being followed by the German explorer Wilhelm Filchner. Filchner had left Bremerhaven in May 1911; in December 1912, the news arrived from South Georgia that his expedition had failed. The transcontinental journey, in Shackleton's words, was the "one great object of Antarctic journeyings" remaining, now open to him.

Imperial Trans-Antarctic Expedition, 1914–1917

Preparations 

Shackleton published details of his new expedition, grandly titled the "Imperial Trans-Antarctic Expedition", early in 1914. There is a legend that Shackleton posted an advertisement which emphasised the hardship and danger of the voyage, so that he could better narrow down and select candidates for his expedition, but no record of any such advertisement has survived and its existence is considered doubtful. Two ships would be employed; Endurance would carry the main party into the Weddell Sea, aiming for Vahsel Bay from where a team of six, led by Shackleton, would begin the crossing of the continent. Meanwhile, a second ship, the Aurora, would take a supporting party under Captain Aeneas Mackintosh to McMurdo Sound on the opposite side of the continent.

Shackleton used his considerable fund-raising skills, and the expedition was financed largely by private donations, although the British government gave £10,000 (about £900,000 in 2019 terms). Scottish jute magnate Sir James Caird gave £24,000, Midlands industrialist Frank Dudley Docker gave £10,000, and tobacco heiress Janet Stancomb-Wills gave an undisclosed but reportedly "generous" sum. Public interest in the expedition was considerable; Shackleton received more than 5,000 applications to join it.

His interviewing and selection methods sometimes seemed eccentric; believing that character and temperament were as important as technical ability, he asked unconventional questions. Thus physicist Reginald James was asked if he could sing; others were accepted on sight because Shackleton liked the look of them, or after the briefest of interrogations. Shackleton also loosened some traditional hierarchies to promote camaraderie, such as distributing the ship's chores equally among officers, scientists, and seamen. He also socialised with his crew members every evening after dinner, leading sing-alongs, jokes, and games. He ultimately selected a crew of 56, twenty-eight on each ship.

Despite the outbreak of the First World War on 3 August 1914, Endurance was directed by the First Lord of the Admiralty, Winston Churchill, to "proceed", and left British waters on 8 August. Shackleton delayed his own departure until 27 September, meeting the ship in Buenos Aires.

Crew 
While Shackleton led the expedition, Captain F. Worsley commanded the Endurance and Lieutenant J. Stenhouse the Aurora. On the Endurance, the second in command was the experienced explorer Frank Wild. The meteorologist was Captain L. Hussey, also an able banjo player. McIlroy was head of the scientific staff, which included Wordie.

Alexander Macklin was one of two surgeons and also in charge of keeping the 70 dogs healthy. Tom Crean was in more immediate charge as head dog-handler. Other crew included James, Hussey, Greenstreet, a carpenter Harry McNish, and a biologist named Clark. Of later independent fame was the photographer Frank Hurley, known on this mission for his perilous shots. There also was Perce Blackborow who was a Welsh sailor who stowed away on the journey; although Shackleton was annoyed by this, there was no reason to turn back by the time the situation was discovered, and Blackborow was made a steward.

There was a (male) cat named Mrs Chippy that belonged to the carpenter Harry McNish. Mrs Chippy was shot when the Endurance sank, due to the belief that he would not have survived the ordeal that followed.

Loss of Endurance 
Endurance departed from South Georgia for the Weddell Sea on 5 December, heading for Vahsel Bay. As the ship moved southward navigating in ice, first-year ice was encountered, which slowed progress. Deep in the Weddell Sea, conditions gradually grew worse until, on 19 January 1915, Endurance became frozen fast in an ice floe.

On 24 February, realising that she would be trapped until the following spring, Shackleton ordered the abandonment of ship's routine and her conversion to a winter station. She drifted slowly northward with the ice through the following months. When spring arrived in September, the breaking of the ice and its later movements put extreme pressures on the ship's hull.

Until this point, Shackleton had hoped that the ship, when released from the ice, could work her way back towards Vahsel Bay. On 24 October, water began pouring in. After a few days, with the position at 69° 5' S, 51° 30' W, Shackleton gave the order to abandon ship, saying, "She's going down!"; and men, provisions and equipment were transferred to camps on the ice. On 21 November 1915, the wreck finally slipped beneath the surface.

After failed attempts to march across the ice to this island, Shackleton decided to set up another more permanent camp (Patience Camp) on another floe, and trust to the drift of the ice to take them towards a safe landing. By 17 March, their ice camp was within  of Paulet Island; however, separated by impassable ice, they were unable to reach it. On 9 April, their ice floe broke into two, and Shackleton ordered the crew into the lifeboats and to head for the nearest land.

After five harrowing days at sea, the exhausted men landed their three lifeboats at Elephant Island,  from where the Endurance sank. This was the first time they had stood on solid ground for 497 days. Shackleton's concern for his men was such that he gave his mittens to photographer Frank Hurley, who had lost his during the boat journey. Shackleton suffered frostbitten fingers as a result.

Open-boat journey 

Elephant Island was an inhospitable place, far from any shipping routes; rescue by means of chance discovery was very unlikely. Consequently, Shackleton decided to risk an open-boat journey to the 720-nautical-mile-distant South Georgia whaling stations, where he knew help was available. The strongest of the tiny  lifeboats, christened  after the expedition's chief sponsor, was chosen for the trip. Ship's carpenter Harry McNish made various improvements, including raising the sides, strengthening the keel, building a makeshift deck of wood and canvas, and sealing the work with oil paint and seal blood.

Shackleton chose five companions for the journey: Frank Worsley, Endurances captain, who would be responsible for navigation; Tom Crean, who had "begged to go"; two strong sailors in John Vincent and Timothy McCarthy, and finally the carpenter McNish. McNish had clashed with Shackleton during the time when the party was stranded on the ice, but, while Shackleton did not forget the carpenter's earlier insubordination, Shackleton recognised his value for this particular job. Not only did Shackleton recognise their value for the job but also because he knew the potential risk they were to morale. This allowed for Shackleton to remain in control of the morale of his crew members. The attitudes of his men were a point of emphasis in leading his men back to safety.

Shackleton refused to pack supplies for more than four weeks, knowing that if they did not reach South Georgia within that time, the boat and its crew would be lost. The James Caird was launched on 24 April 1916; during the next fifteen days, it sailed through the waters of the southern ocean, at the mercy of the stormy seas, in constant peril of capsizing. On 8 May, thanks to Worsley's navigational skills, the cliffs of South Georgia came into sight, but hurricane-force winds prevented the possibility of landing. The party was forced to ride out the storm offshore, in constant danger of being dashed against the rocks. They later learned that the same hurricane had sunk a 500-ton steamer bound for South Georgia from Buenos Aires.

On the following day, they were able, finally, to land on the unoccupied southern shore. After a period of rest and recuperation, rather than risk putting to sea again to reach the whaling stations on the northern coast, Shackleton decided to attempt a land crossing of the island. Although it is likely that Norwegian whalers had previously crossed at other points on ski, no one had attempted this particular route before. Leaving McNish, Vincent and McCarthy at the landing point on South Georgia, Shackleton travelled  with Worsley and Crean over extremely dangerous mountainous terrain for 36 hours to reach the whaling station at Stromness on 20 May.

The next successful crossing of South Georgia was in October 1955, by the British explorer Duncan Carse, who travelled much of the same route as Shackleton's party. In tribute to their achievement, he wrote: "I do not know how they did it, except that they had to—three men of the heroic age of Antarctic exploration with 50 feet of rope between them—and a carpenter's adze".

Rescue 

Shackleton immediately sent a boat to pick up the three men from the other side of South Georgia while he set to work to organise the rescue of the Elephant Island men. His first three attempts were foiled by sea ice, which blocked the approaches to the island. Yelcho, commanded by Captain Luis Pardo, and the British whaler Southern Sky reached Elephant Island on 30 August 1916, at which point the men had been isolated there for four and a half months, and Shackleton quickly evacuated all 22 men. The Yelcho took the crew first to Punta Arenas and after some days to Valparaiso in Chile where crowds warmly welcomed them back to civilisation.

There remained the men of the Ross Sea Party, who were stranded at Cape Evans in McMurdo Sound, after Aurora had been blown from its anchorage and driven out to sea, unable to return. The ship, after a drift of many months, had returned to New Zealand. Shackleton travelled there to join Aurora, and sailed with her to the rescue of the Ross Sea party. This group, despite many hardships, had carried out its depot-laying mission to the full, but three lives had been lost, including that of its commander, Aeneas Mackintosh.

First World War 
When Shackleton returned to England in May 1917, Europe was in the midst of the First World War. Suffering from a heart condition, made worse by the fatigue of his arduous journeys, and too old to be conscripted, he nevertheless volunteered for the army. Repeatedly requesting posting to the front in France, he was by now drinking heavily. In October 1917, he was sent to Buenos Aires to boost British propaganda in South America. Unqualified as a diplomat, he was unsuccessful in persuading Argentina and Chile to enter the war on the Allied side. He returned home in April 1918.

Shackleton was then briefly involved in a mission to Spitzbergen to establish a British presence there under guise of a mining operation. On the way he was taken ill in Tromsø, possibly with a heart attack. Appointment to a military expedition to Murmansk obliged him to return home again, before departing for northern Russia.

Russian Civil War 
Shackleton was specially appointed a temporary major on 22 July 1918. From October 1918, he served with the North Russia Expeditionary Force in the Russian Civil War under the command of Major-General Edmund Ironside, with the role of advising on the equipment and training of British forces in arctic conditions.

For his "valuable services rendered in connection with Military Operations in North Russia" Shackleton was appointed an Officer of the Order of the British Empire in the 1919 King's Birthday Honours, and was also mentioned in despatches by General Ironside. Shackleton returned to England in early March 1919, full of plans for the economic development of Northern Russia. In the midst of seeking capital, his plans foundered when Northern Russia fell to Bolshevik control. He was finally discharged from the army in October 1919, retaining his rank of major.

Final expedition and death 

Shackleton returned to the lecture circuit and published his own account of the Endurance expedition, South, in December 1919. In 1920, tired of the lecture circuit, Shackleton began to consider the possibility of a last expedition. He thought seriously of going to the Beaufort Sea area of the Arctic, a largely unexplored region, and raised some interest in this idea from the Canadian government. With funds supplied by former schoolfriend John Quiller Rowett, he acquired a 125-ton Norwegian sealer, named Foca I, which he renamed .

The plan changed; the destination became the Antarctic, and the project was defined by Shackleton as an "oceanographic and sub-antarctic expedition". The goals of the venture were imprecise, but a circumnavigation of the Antarctic continent and investigation of some "lost" sub-Antarctic islands, such as Tuanaki, were mentioned as objectives.

Rowett agreed to finance the entire expedition, which became known as the Shackleton–Rowett Expedition. On 16 September 1921, Shackleton recorded a farewell address on a sound-on-film system created by Harry Grindell Matthews, who claimed it was the first "talking picture" ever made. The expedition left England on 24 September 1921.

Although some of his former crew members had not received all their pay from the Endurance expedition, many of them signed on with their former "Boss". When the party arrived in Rio de Janeiro, Shackleton suffered a suspected heart attack. He refused a proper medical examination, so Quest continued south, and on 4 January 1922, arrived at South Georgia.

In the early hours of the next morning, Shackleton summoned the expedition's physician, Alexander Macklin, to his cabin, complaining of back pains and other discomfort. According to Macklin's own account, Macklin told him he had been overdoing things and should try to "lead a more regular life", to which Shackleton answered: "You are always wanting me to give up things, what is it I ought to give up?" "Chiefly alcohol, Boss", replied Macklin. A few moments later, at 2:50 a.m. on 5 January 1922, Shackleton suffered a fatal heart attack.

Macklin, who conducted the postmortem, concluded that the cause of death was atheroma of the coronary arteries exacerbated by "overstrain during a period of debility". Leonard Hussey, a veteran of the Imperial Trans-Antarctic expedition, offered to accompany the body back to Britain; while he was in Montevideo en route to England, a message was received from Emily Shackleton asking that her husband be buried in South Georgia. Hussey returned to South Georgia with the body on the steamer , and on 5 March 1922, Shackleton was buried in the Grytviken cemetery, South Georgia, after a short service in the Lutheran church, with Edward Binnie officiating. Macklin wrote in his diary: "I think this is as 'the Boss' would have had it himself, standing lonely in an island far from civilisation, surrounded by stormy tempestuous seas, & in the vicinity of one of his greatest exploits."

Study of diaries kept by Eric Marshall, medical officer to the 190709 expedition, suggests that Shackleton suffered from an atrial septal defect ("hole in the heart"), a congenital heart defect, which may have been a cause of his health problems.

Shackleton's will was proven in London on 12 May 1922. Dying heavily in debt, Shackleton's small estate consisted of personal effects to the value of £556 2s. 2d. (equivalent to £ in ) which he bequeathed to his wife. Lady Shackleton survived her husband by 14 years, dying in 1936.

On 27 November 2011, the ashes of Frank Wild were interred on the right-hand side of Shackleton's gravesite in Grytviken. The inscription on the rough-hewn granite block set to mark the spot reads: "Frank Wild 1873–1939, Shackleton's right-hand man."

Legacy

Early 

Before the return of Shackleton's body to South Georgia, there was a memorial service held for him with full military honours at Holy Trinity Church, Montevideo, and on 2 March a service was held at St Paul's Cathedral, London, at which the King and other members of the royal family were represented. Within a year the first biography, The Life of Sir Ernest Shackleton, by Hugh Robert Mill, was published. This book, as well as being a tribute to the explorer, was a practical effort to assist his family; Shackleton died some £40,000 in debt (equivalent to £ in ) A further initiative was the establishment of a Shackleton Memorial Fund, which was used to assist the education of his children and the support of his mother.

During the ensuing decades Shackleton's status as a polar hero was generally outshone by that of Captain Scott, whose polar party had by 1925 been commemorated on more than 30 monuments in Britain alone, including stained glass windows, statues, busts and memorial tablets. A statue of Shackleton designed by Charles Sargeant Jagger was unveiled at the Royal Geographical Society's Kensington headquarters in 1932, but public memorials to Shackleton were relatively few. The printed word saw much more attention given to Scott—a forty-page booklet on Shackleton, published in 1943 by OUP as part of a "Great Exploits" series, is described by cultural historian Stephanie Barczewski as "a lone example of a popular literary treatment of Shackleton in a sea of similar treatments of Scott". This disparity continued into the 1950s.

Later 
In 1959, Alfred Lansing's Endurance: Shackleton's Incredible Voyage was published. This was the first of a number of books about Shackleton that began to appear, showing him in a highly positive light. At the same time, attitudes towards Scott were gradually changing as a more critical note was sounded in the literature, culminating in Roland Huntford's 1979 treatment of him in his dual biography Scott and Amundsen, described by Barczewski as a "devastating attack". This negative picture of Scott became accepted as the popular truth as the kind of heroism that Scott represented fell victim to the cultural shifts of the late twentieth century. Within a few years, he was thoroughly overtaken in public esteem by Shackleton, whose popularity surged while that of his erstwhile rival declined. In 2002, in a BBC poll conducted to determine the "100 Greatest Britons", Shackleton was ranked 11th while Scott was down in 54th place.

In 1983 the BBC produced and broadcast the miniseries Shackleton, which was released on DVD in 2017. In 2001 Margaret Morrell and Stephanie Capparell presented Shackleton as a model for corporate leadership in their book Shackleton's Way: Leadership Lessons from the Great Antarctic Explorer. They wrote: "Shackleton resonates with executives in today's business world. His people-centred approach to leadership can be a guide to anyone in a position of authority". Other management writers soon followed this lead, using Shackleton as an exemplar for bringing order from chaos. In 2017 Nancy Koehn argued that, in spite of Shackleton's mistakes, financial problems and narcissism, he developed the capability to be successful.

The Centre for Leadership Studies at the University of Exeter offers a course on Shackleton, who also features in the management education programmes of several American universities. In Boston, a "Shackleton School" was set up on "Outward Bound" principles, with the motto "The Journey is Everything". Shackleton has also been cited as a model leader by the US Navy, and in a textbook on Congressional leadership, Peter L Steinke calls Shackleton the archetype of the "nonanxious leader" whose "calm, reflective demeanor becomes the antibiotic warning of the toxicity of reactive behaviour". In 2001, the Athy Heritage Centre-Museum (now the Shackleton Museum), Athy, County Kildare, Ireland, established the Ernest Shackleton Autumn School, which is held annually, to honour the memory of Ernest Shackleton.

Shackleton's death marked the end of the Heroic Age of Antarctic Exploration, a period of discovery characterised by journeys of geographical and scientific exploration in a largely unknown continent without any of the benefits of modern travel methods or radio communication. In the preface to his 1922 book The Worst Journey in the World, Apsley Cherry-Garrard, one of Scott's team on the Terra Nova Expedition, wrote: "For a joint scientific and geographical piece of organisation, give me Scott; for a Winter Journey, Wilson; for a dash to the Pole and nothing else, Amundsen: and if I am in the devil of a hole and want to get out of it, give me Shackleton every time".

In 1993 Trevor Potts re-enacted the Boat Journey from Elephant Island to South Georgia in honour of Sir Ernest Shackleton, totally unsupported, in a replica of the James Caird. In 2002, Channel 4 in the UK produced Shackleton, a TV serial depicting the 1914 expedition with Kenneth Branagh in the title role. Broadcast in the US on the A&E Network, it won two Emmy Awards.

In a Christie's auction in London in 2011, a biscuit that Shackleton gave "a starving fellow traveller" on the 1907–1909 Nimrod expedition sold for £1250. That same year, on the date of what would have been Shackleton's 137th birthday, Google honoured him with a Google Doodle. Asteroid 289586 Shackleton, discovered by Swiss amateur astronomer Michel Ory in 2005, was named in his memory. The official  was published by the Minor Planet Center on 10 December 2011.

In January 2013, a joint British-Australian team set out to duplicate Shackleton's 1916 trip across the Southern Ocean. Led by explorer and environmental scientist Tim Jarvis, the team was assembled at the request of Alexandra Shackleton, Sir Ernest's granddaughter, who felt the trip would honour her grandfather's legacy. This team became the first to replicate the so-called "double crossing", sailing from Elephant Island to South Georgia and crossing the South Georgian mountains from King Haakon Bay (where Shackleton had landed nearly 100 years prior) to Stromness. The expedition very carefully matched legacy conditions, using a replica of the James Caird (named for the project's patron: the Alexandra Shackleton), period clothing (by Burberry), replica rations (both in calorific content and rough constitution), period navigational aids, and a Thomas Mercer chronometer just as Shackleton had used. This expedition was made into a documentary film, screening as Chasing Shackleton on PBS in the US, and Shackleton: Death or Glory elsewhere on the Discovery Channel.

Also in 2013, a genus of lichen-forming fungi in the Teloschistaceae family was published as Shackletonia by botanists Søchting, Frödén & Arup.

In October 2015, Shackleton's decorations and medals were auctioned; the sale raised £585,000. 

In January 2016, Shackleton featured on a series of UK postage stamps issued by the Royal Mail on the centenary of the Endurance expedition. In August 2016 a statue of Shackleton by Mark Richards was erected in Athy, sponsored by Kildare County Council. In 2017, the musical play Ernest Shackleton Loves Me by Val Vigoda and Joe DiPietro made its debut in New York City at the Tony Kiser Theater, an off-Broadway venue. Blended with a parallel story of a struggling composer, the play retells the adventure of Endurance in detail, incorporating photos and videos of the journey.

Awards and decorations 

British decorations
 Knight Bachelor (1909)
 Commander of the Royal Victorian Order (CVO, 1909; MVO 4th Class: 1907)
 Officer of the Order of the British Empire, Military Division (OBE, 1918)
 Polar Medal (1904; with clasp for Nimrod Expedition: 1909)
 British War Medal (1918)
 Allied Victory Medal (1918, with MID)

Other decorations
 Knight of the Order of the Dannebrog of Denmark (1909)
 Knight of the Order of the Polar Star of Sweden (1909)
 Knight of the Order of St. Olav of Norway (1909)
 Officer of the Legion of Honour of France (1909)
 Knight of the Order of the Crown of Italy (1910)
 Order of St. Anna, 3rd Class, of Russia (1910)
 Order of the Crown of Prussia, 3rd Class (1911)
 Officer of the Chilean Order of Merit (1916)
 Gold Medal of the Royal Geographical Society of Antwerp (1909)

Arms

See also 
 Aurora Australis, the first book produced in Antarctica, during the Nimrod Expedition
 Avro Shackleton, British long-range maritime patrol aircraft used by the Royal Air Force, named after him
 , a research ship operated by the British Antarctic Survey
 Shackleton crater, an impact crater near the south pole of the Moon
 Third man factor, refers to the reported situations where an unseen presence such as a "spirit" provided comfort or support during traumatic experiences.

References

Explanatory notes

Citations

General bibliography

General online sources

Further reading

External links 

 
 
 
 
 
 

Military personnel from County Kildare
 
20th-century Anglo-Irish people
20th-century explorers
1874 births
1922 deaths
Antarctic expedition deaths
Articles containing video clips
British Army personnel of the Russian Civil War
British Army personnel of World War I
Collections of the Scott Polar Research Institute
Commanders of the Royal Victorian Order
Explorers of Antarctica
Fellows of the Royal Geographical Society
Fellows of the Royal Scottish Geographical Society
Imperial Trans-Antarctic Expedition
Irish Antarctic explorers
Irish Freemasons
Knights Bachelor
Liberal Unionist Party parliamentary candidates
Officers of the Order of the British Empire
People educated at Dulwich College
People from County Kildare
Recipients of the Cullum Geographical Medal
Recipients of the Polar Medal
Royal Naval Volunteer Reserve personnel
Royal Navy officers
South Pole
Royal Naval Reserve personnel
Members of Trinity House